Chak Imam Ali is a census town in Allahabad district  in the state of Uttar Pradesh, India.

Demographics
 India census, Chak Imam Ali had a population of 4,124. Males constitute 54% of the population and females 46%. Chak Imam Ali has an average literacy rate of 82%, higher than the national average of 59.5%; with male literacy of 87% and female literacy of 76%. 9% of the population is under 6 years of age.

References

Cities and towns in Allahabad district